The Diocese of Zanzibar is a Latin Church ecclesiastical jurisdiction or diocese of the Catholic Church. It is a suffragan in the ecclesiastical province of the metropolitan Archdiocese of Dar-es-Salaam.

The diocese’s cathedral is St. Joseph's Cathedral located in the episcopal see of Zanzibar.

History 

 Established 1860 as Apostolic Prefecture of Zanguebar, on vast East African territory split off from the Diocese of Saint-Denis-de-La Réunion in Réunion
 1883: Promoted as Apostolic Vicariate of Zanguebar, hence entitled to a titular bishop
 November 16, 1887: Renamed as Apostolic Vicariate of Northern Zanguebar, having lost territory to establish the Apostolic Prefecture of Southern Zanguebar
 Lost territories repeatedly : in 1904 to establish the Apostolic Prefecture of Benadir, on 1905.09.14 to establish the Mission sui juris of Kenya and on 1906.05.11 to establish the Apostolic Vicariate of Central Zanguebar
 Renamed in 1906 as Apostolic Vicariate of Zanzibar
 Suppressed on 1953.03.25, its territory being used to establish the Metropolitan Archdiocese of Nairobi
 Restored but demoted on December 12, 1964 and renamed as Apostolic Administration of Zanzibar and Pemba
 Promoted on March 28, 1980 as Diocese of Zanzibar

Ordinaries 

Apostolic Prefects of Zanguebar
 Armand-René Maupoint (1862 – 1871.07.10), while Bishop of mother diocese (Saint-Denis-de-) La Réunion (Réunion) ([1857.02.14] 1857.03.19 – 1871.07.10)
 Homer, Holy Ghost Fathers (C.S.Sp.) (1872 – 1882)
 Jean-Marie-Raoul Le Bas de Courmont, C.S.Sp. (1883.10.27 – 1883.11.23 see below)

Apostolic Vicars of Zanguebar
 Jean-Marie-Raoul Le Bas de Courmont, C.S.Sp. (see above 1883.11.23 – 1887 see below), Titular Bishop of Bodona (1883.11.23 – 1925.02.20)

Apostolic Vicars of Northern Zanguebar
 Jean-Marie-Raoul Le Bas de Courmont, C.S.Sp. (see above 1887 – 1896.11.27)
 Emile-Auguste Allgeyer, C.S.Sp. (1897.02.17 – 1906.12.21 see below), Titular Bishop of Ticelia (1897.02.17 – 1924.04.09)

Apostolic Vicars of Zanzibar
 Emile-Auguste Allgeyer, C.S.Sp. (see above 1906.12.21 – 1913.04.03)
 John Gerald Neville, C.S.Sp. (1913.09.01 – 1930.03.08), Titular Bishop of Carrhæ (1913.09.01 – 1943.02.27)
Apostolic Administrator^ the same John Gerald Neville, C.S.Sp. (1930.03.08 – 1943.02.27)
 John William Heffernan, C.S.Sp. (1932.03.15 – 1946), Titular Bishop of Uzippari (1932.03.15 – 1966.03.20)
 John Joseph McCarthy, C.S.Sp. (1946.07.11 – 1953.03.25), Titular Bishop of Cercina (1946.07.11 – 1953.03.25), later Metropolitan Archbishop of Nairobi (Kenya) (1953.03.25 – 1971.10.24), President of Kenya Conference of Catholic Bishops (1969 – 1970)

(suppressed 1953 - 1964)

Apostolic Administrators of Zanzibar and Pemba 
 Edgard Aristide Maranta, Capuchin Franciscans (O.F.M. Cap.) (1964.12.12 – 1966), Titular Bishop of Vinda (1930.03.27 – 1953.03.25), while Metropolitan Archbishop of Dar-es-Salaam (Tanzania) (1953.03.25 – 1968.12.19)
 Joseph Sipendi (1966 – 1968), later Bishop of Moshi(Tanzania) (1968.01.11 – 1985.04.29)
 Adriani Mkoba (1968.07.16 – 1973.01.26), while Bishop of Morogoro (Tanzania) (1966.12.15 – 1992.11.06)
 Bernard Martin Ngaviliau, C.S.Sp. (1973 – 1980.03.28 see below)

Suffragan Bishops of Zanzibar 
 Bernard Martin Ngaviliau, C.S.Sp. (see above 1980.03.28 – 1996.11.30)
 Augustine Ndeliakyama Shao, C.S.Sp. (1996.11.30 - ...)

See also
 Roman Catholicism in Tanzania

Source and External links 
 GCatholic.org with incumebt biography links
 Catholic Hierarchy

Roman Catholic dioceses in Tanzania
Religious organizations established in 1860
Religion in Zanzibar
Roman Catholic dioceses and prelatures established in the 19th century
Zanzibar, Roman Catholic Diocese of
1860 establishments in Zanzibar